Sheppard–Yonge (formerly Sheppard) is an interchange station on Line 1 Yonge–University and Line 4 Sheppard of the Toronto subway. The station is located at the southern end of North York City Centre.

History
The H-2 class subway cars delivered in 1971 included destination signs for "Sheppard via downtown" on the expectation that it would be a terminal station.

The station was expanded and renamed "Sheppard–Yonge" in 2002 with the opening of the Sheppard subway line, for which this station became the western terminus. The renaming was similar to that of Bloor–Yonge station. Unlike Bloor–Yonge, where the signs on Line 1 platforms still read "Bloor" and those on the Line 2 Bloor–Danforth read "Yonge", Sheppard–Yonge is given its full name on both sets of platforms; all existing signs within the station were changed to give the new name. At that time, this station became accessible with elevators.  When the automated announcements were installed on Toronto's subway trains, Line 1 trains referred to the station as "Sheppard" while Line 4 trains referred to the station as "Sheppard–Yonge", the new Toronto Rocket subway trains refer to the station on both Lines 1 and 4 as "Sheppard–Yonge" followed by "Change for Line 1/4" respectively.

Station description
The station is located under Yonge Street at Sheppard Avenue, and is built on five levels. All seven entrances are located at street level, as is the bus platform. The three levels below are concourse levels, which provide access to the bus platform and the two subway lines. The subway platforms are on the two lower levels, with the Yonge–University line on the bottom and the newer Sheppard line crossing above.

Entrances
There are six entrances – five automated entrances (all of which are only accessible by Presto card) and two staffed entrances:
 An accessible automatic entrance on the northeast side of Yonge Street and Sheppard Avenue beside the Sheppard Centre. This was a staffed entrance until October 21, 2019, when the collector booth was closed.
 An accessible staffed entrance accessed via the Hullmark Centre entrance on the southeast corner of Yonge and Sheppard
 An accessible automatic entrance accessed via a private elevator in the Nestle Canada Building at 25 Sheppard Avenue West, one block west of Yonge
 An automatic entrance at Harlandale and Yonge, one block north of Sheppard
 An automatic entrance on the northeast corner of Yonge Street and Anndale Drive, accessed via the Procter & Gamble building (Monday to Friday 6am to 7pm, excluding holidays) or via the underground parking lot of Whole Foods Market
 An automatic entrance accessed via the Emerald Park building on the northwest corner of Yonge Street at Poyntz Avenue

Architecture and art

The station on the Sheppard line was designed by architectural firm NORR Limited. The construction of the Sheppard line included the integration of the bus terminal at street level into the fare-paid zone.

The artwork in the station, entitled Immersion Land and created by the artist Stacey Spiegel, consists of panoramic posterized murals created from 150 digital photos rendered onto single-colour mosaic tiles. The artwork depicts rural scenery along Yonge Street or Highway 11 somewhere between Lake Ontario and North Bay, and is located on the upper (Line 4 Sheppard) platform level.

Subway infrastructure in the vicinity

A connecting track from the southbound Yonge–University line, used only if cars or work equipment need to be transferred between the two lines, curves around to a point 500 metres west of Yonge, where the Sheppard line tunnel actually begins. This provides an area where trains can be stored clear of the line.

In the station, the Sheppard line tracks cross above the Yonge line. The Sheppard line station has platforms on the outer sides of the tracks, but there is also a roughed-in centre platform. Should the station become a busy transport hub, this platform will be opened and trains will open all their doors, allowing riders to enter on one side and exit on the other to improve efficiency.

Trains normally pull into the southern platform to load and discharge passengers, before returning in the direction from which they came; the northern platform is used only by trains which are going out of service and so must discharge their passengers without allowing more aboard.

Just east of the station, the Sheppard line converges with a second junction track from the northbound Yonge–University line.

Surface connections

TTC routes serving the station include:

Notes

References

External links

Line 1 Yonge–University stations
Line 4 Sheppard stations
Railway stations in Canada opened in 1974